In the 1951 Wimbledon Championships – Gentlemen's Singles tennis competition, Dick Savitt defeated Ken McGregor in the final, 6–4, 6–4, 6–4 to win the title. He was the second ever American to win the Wimbledon and Australian tournaments in the same year. Number 4 seed Budge Patty was the defending champion, but lost in the second round to another American, the unseeded 17-year-old Ham Richardson.

Progress of the competition
After defeating Patty, Richardson went out in the fourth round, losing to another unseeded player, the Brazilian Armando Vieira; this was Vieira's most successful Wimbledon, but he lost in the quarterfinals to South Africa's Eric Sturgess, a former world number one, in straight sets. McGregor reached the final by defeating Sturgess in the semifinals.

Seeds

  Frank Sedgman (quarterfinals)
  Jaroslav Drobný (third round)
  Art Larsen (quarterfinals)
  Budge Patty (second round)
  Herbie Flam (semifinals)
  Dick Savitt (champion)
  Ken McGregor (final)
  Eric Sturgess (semifinals)
  Gardnar Mulloy (third round)
  Lennart Bergelin (quarterfinals)

Draw

Finals

Top half

Section 1

Section 2

Section 3

Section 4

Bottom half

Section 5

Section 6

Section 7

Section 8

References

External links
 

Men's Singles
Wimbledon Championship by year – Men's singles